Heathcliff is a half-hour Saturday morning animated series based on the Heathcliff comic strip created by George Gately and produced by Ruby-Spears Productions. It premiered on ABC on October 4, 1980, with a total of 26 episodes produced under the titles Heathcliff and Dingbat and Heathcliff and Marmaduke.

History
The series began production on November 10, 1979.

The first season, called Heathcliff and Dingbat, ran for 13 episodes and included backup segments with Dingbat and the Creeps, who were created for the show.

Dingbat and the Creeps revolved around the adventures of three monstrous characters who were self-employed as "Odd Jobs, Inc." which consisted of Dingbat, a vampire dog who used a bat-shaped novelty straw to eat most foods; Sparerib, a strangely rotund skeleton with the ability to change himself into useful items (such as a floor lamp, which he did in the opening credits); and Nobody, a gravelly-voiced jack-o-lantern who led the team and often found them various work.

The second season, called Heathcliff and Marmaduke, ran for 13 episodes and featured backup segments with fellow comic strip character Marmaduke (although the Marmaduke segments are actually the first to be seen in each half-hour show).

Reruns of the second season (Heathcliff and Marmaduke) were seen occasionally on Boomerang.

In 1983, NBC reran the show as a segment on Thundarr the Barbarian reruns.

Two years after this show ended, another one based on Heathcliff was produced by DiC Entertainment, which was called simply Heathcliff, although for distinction this series is usually referred to by the expanded title of Heathcliff and the Catillac Cats.

Dingbat has appeared as a cameo in a Yogi Bear comic with many Hanna-Barbera animal characters captured. He was the only Ruby-Spears character there.

Cast
 Mel Blanc as Heathcliff, Spike, Mr. Nutmeg, Mr. Schultz, Milkman
 Henry Corden as Clem, Digby, Dogcatcher, Officer Casey
 June Foray as Iggy, Muggsy, Mrs. Nutmeg, Sonja, Marcy
 Don Messick as Sparerib, Nobody, Mr. Post, Mr. Snyder
 Russi Taylor as Barbie Winslow, Billy Winslow, Dottie Winslow
 Frank Welker as Dingbat
 Paul Winchell as Marmaduke, Phil Winslow

Additional voices
 Takayo Doran - (Season 1)
 Clare Peck - (Season 1)
 Marilyn Schreffler - (Season 1 & 2)
 Judy Strangis - (Season 1)
 Janet Waldo - (Season 1)
 Alan Dinehart - (Season 2)
 Avery Schreiber - (Season 2)
 Hal Smith - (Season 2)

Episodes

Season 1: Heathcliff and Dingbat (1980–81)
Each episode consists of two 5-minute Heathcliff cartoons and two 5-minute "Dingbat and the Creeps" cartoons.

Season 2: Heathcliff and Marmaduke (1981–82)
Each episode consists of a 6-minute Heathcliff cartoon sandwiched between two 6-minute Marmaduke cartoons. Scatman Crothers sang its theme song. It competed with The Smurfs on NBC.

Home media
Warner Bros. Home Entertainment released The Heathcliff and Dingbat Show on DVD in region 1 via their Warner Archive Collection in August 2012. This is a Manufacture-on-Demand (MOD) release, available exclusively in the US and only through Warner's online store or Amazon.com.

References

External links
 Heathcliff official website
 
 Big Cartoon Database – Heathcliff and Dingbat
 Big Cartoon Database – Heathcliff and Marmaduke
 planete-jeunesse (French)
 Retroland

1980 American television series debuts
1982 American television series endings
1980s American animated television series
American children's animated comedy television series
Television series by Ruby-Spears
American Broadcasting Company original programming
Heathcliff (comics)
Television shows based on comic strips
Animated television series about cats
Television series created by Joe Ruby
Television series created by Ken Spears